Vojin Jelić (27 November 1921 – 19 December 2004) was a Croatian Serb writer and poet. His literally work was focused on neo-veristic introspective and retrospective interaction with Serb culture and stories from the Knin region and the wider Dalmatian Hinterland.

Jelić's work was translated into Czech, Slovene, Macedonian and English.

Biography

He was born in Knin in 1921. Jelić finished gymnasium in Šibenik in 1940. He went on to study pharmacy in Belgrade.

During the World War II in Yugoslavia Jelić joined Yugoslav Partisans where he joined their units in 1943. From 1944 je joined editorijal board of the Srpska riječ ("The Serb Word") magazine.

Following the end of war Jelić initiated forestry studies in Prague in Czechoslovakia in 1945 and he completed his studies in Zagreb 1949. He wrote about Serbian culture and stories from the Knin region and Dalmatian Hinterland. He contributed to various publications and worked as a faculty lecturer and cultural advisor in various institutions in the Socialist Republic of Croatia. Jelić was the secretary general of the SKD Prosvjeta.

Jelić distanced himself from public life in Croatia in 1992 during the Croatian War of Independence and after Nedjeljko Mihanović verbally attacked him on ethnic basis. He died in Zagreb in 2004.

Published works
 1950: Đukin đerdan 
 1952: Ljudi kamenjara
 1952: Limeni pijetao
 1952: Ni brige te sivi tiću
 1953: Anđeli lijepo pjevaju
 1956: Nebo nema obala
 1959: Trka slijepih konja
 1960: Lete slijepi miševi
 1961: Ne damo vam umrijeti
 1963: Trči mali život
 1969: Domino
 1970: Kirvaj
 1975: Pobožni đavo
 1977: Gorki bajami
 1981: Doživotni grešnici
 1986: Kozji dvorac
 1996: Pogledajte svoje ruke
 2000: Dražba zavičaja

Sources
 

1921 births
2004 deaths
People from Knin
Serbs of Croatia
Croatian male poets
Vladimir Nazor Award winners
Burials at Mirogoj Cemetery
20th-century Croatian poets
20th-century male writers
Yugoslav poets